The Oulankajoki ( - Olanga) is a river of Finland and Russia (Republic of Karelia). It is part of the Kovda river system. The Oulankajoki discharges into the Lake Pyaozero in the Republic of Karelia in Russia, which is drained by the Kovda towards the White Sea.

See also
List of rivers of Finland

References

Rivers of Finland
Rivers of Salla
Rivers of Kuusamo
Rivers of the Republic of Karelia
International rivers of Europe